Nancy Lewington is a Canadian sprinter, born in Hamilton, Ontario, who competed in the 1960 Rome Olympics, where she ran in the Women's 100 metres and the Women's 4 × 100 metres relay.

She is also a photographer with works on display with the Art of the Olympians.

References

Living people
Canadian female sprinters
Olympic track and field athletes of Canada
Athletes from Hamilton, Ontario
Athletes (track and field) at the 1960 Summer Olympics
Year of birth missing (living people)
Olympic female sprinters